Grignano can refer to the following places in Italy:

Grignano (Brembate), the only frazione of Brembate
Grignano (Castellina in Chianti), frazione of Castellina in Chianti
Grignano (Prato), frazione of Prato
, frazione of Trieste
Grignano Polesine, frazione of Rovigo